Oleh Anatoliiovych Husiev (born 25 April 1983) is a retired Ukrainian football midfielder who played for FC Dynamo Kyiv. He mainly played as a right midfielder or a right-back.

He made over 250 Ukrainian Premier League appearances for Dynamo, winning the league three times in addition to four Ukrainian Cups and five Ukrainian Super Cups.

A full international since 2003, Husiev earned over 95 caps, making him the nation's third-most capped player and fourth-highest international goalscorer of all time. He represented Ukraine at the 2006 FIFA World Cup and UEFA Euro 2012.

Club career
Husiev transferred to Dynamo in the summer of 2003. Following his strong display in the 2006 FIFA World Cup, he was linked with a move to French side Olympique Lyonnais. However, Dynamo Kyiv President Ihor Surkis stated that Husiev, along with fellow players Artem Milevskyi and Ruslan Rotan, are "the future of Dynamo Kyiv".

On 30 March 2014, Husiev suffered a knee to the head from goalkeeper Denys Boyko (on loan from Dynamo Kyiv to Dnipro) grabbing a ball in midair, this collision knocked him to the ground, where he laid motionless for a few seconds before one of the Dnipro midfielders, Jaba Kankava, ran over to open Husiev's mouth and moved his tongue to allow Husiev to breathe. Kankava is credited with possibly saving Husiev's life.

On 20 September 2015, Husiev scored a penalty in a 0–2 away win against Volyn Lutsk in the Ukrainian Premier League, which was marked as his 100th competitive senior goal.

Having left Dynamo Kyiv in December 2016, Husiev returned to Dynamo on 13 June 2017, signing a one-year contract. In 2018 it was announced that he is attending coaching class at the Kyiv Oblast Football Federation.

International career
Husiev made his senior international debut for Ukraine on 20 August 2003, replacing fellow debutant Serhiy Tkachenko at half time in a 0–2 friendly defeat to Romania at the Shakhtar Stadium in Donetsk. He scored his first goal for the team on 17 November 2004, opening a 3–0 away win over Turkey in the ninth minute, for 2006 World Cup qualification. Husiev played all five of Ukraine's games as they reached the quarter-finals at their first World Cup in Germany, scoring the winner in their last-16 penalty shootout against Switzerland. He also played all of their matches as they co-hosted UEFA Euro 2012 with Poland, in a group stage exit.

Career statistics

Club

International
Scores and results list Ukraine's goal tally first, score column indicates score after each Husiev goal.

Honours
Dynamo Kyiv
Ukrainian Premier League: 2003–04, 2006–07, 2008–09, 2014–15, 2015–16
Ukrainian Cup: 2004–05, 2005–06, 2006–07, 2013–14, 2014–15
Ukrainian Super Cup: 2004, 2006, 2007, 2009, 2011

Individual
 Ukrainian Premier League Footballer of the Year: 2005

See also
 2001 FIFA World Youth Championship squads#Ukraine

References

External links

 Oleh Husiev at FC Dynamo website
 Oleh Husiev at footballcritic.com

1983 births
Living people
Ukrainian footballers
Ukraine international footballers
Ukraine under-21 international footballers
FC Dynamo Kyiv players
FC Arsenal Kyiv players
FC Borysfen Boryspil players
FC Frunzenets-Liha-99 Sumy players
2006 FIFA World Cup players
UEFA Euro 2012 players
Ukrainian Premier League players
Association football midfielders
Ukrainian football managers
Sportspeople from Sumy Oblast
FC Dynamo Kyiv non-playing staff